Dhuruvangal Pathinaaru, also known as D-16, is a 2016 Indian neo-noir crime thriller film written and directed by Karthick Naren, and starring Rahman. Featuring a predominantly new cast and crew, the film features music composed by Jakes Bejoy, cinematography handled by Sujith Sarang and editing done by Sreejith Sarang. Released on 29 December 2016, the film went on to gain positive reviews from film critics as well becoming a sleeper hit and blockbuster. The film was remade in Kannada as Aa Drushya (2019). The film is going to be remade in Hindi with Varun Dhawan in the lead role.

Plot
  
The story begins with Deepak  narrating the story of one of his cases that occurred during his service as a police officer in Coimbatore. Deepak narrates the story to a man who is the son of another police officer who has come for taking career advice from him. Three young men - Fabian, Mano and Melvin - hit a man with the car they were driving on a rainy day in a neighborhood. Afraid that they might get caught, they carry the body to their home. Deepak continues the story from his perspective. He comes to his office in the morning and his subordinate officer informs him about the suicide of a person named Krish that has happened in the area and hands over the license of that person. The informer, who is a paperboy, is called in to give his information. On his way out, the paperboy sees the car from the crime scene and shouts out to the police, but they ignore him.

Deepak visits the crime scene and meets the new police officer, Gautham. Gautham follows his instinct and mentions those young men. They go to investigate them and act suspiciously. After finding nothing, they return to the office. While on their way, they get a call informing them of another incident. They go there to find that Shruti is missing and there are bloodstains in her bedroom. Her friend Vaishnavi was the one to identify this. Later, Deepak gets a call saying that the previous day's evening, Shruti had filed a complained against someone called Mano. Deepak recognizes the name as that of one of the young men and interrogates them. They tell of the incident that happened 10 days prior to missing of Shruti. The incident was - she unknowingly over speeds and nearly hits them. The three young men also confess that after the incident, they have not met her. On further investigation in Shruti's apartment, it is revealed that the blood group is B+, which matches with Krish.

Gautham investigates and identifies that Shruti had told the neighbor about a young man who is her fiancé. They decide that the fiancé might be Krish and decide to watch the young men as suspects. As the day ends, Deepak decides to go home. His neighbor informs him about a young man who was waiting for him. Deepak had captured a camera from some kids. These kids were asked to meet him at his residence for getting back the camera. From the camera, Deepak sees that Vaishnavi has lied about arriving late to the house, while she was there earlier. He also notices the car number from the video. Both Gautham and Deepak decide to check on Vaishnavi, but they realize that she is missing from her house. They go looking for her everywhere but she is not found. She is then shown to be at the airport. Gautham and Deepak come to the conclusion that one among the young boys might have been the suspect and that Shruti would have given a complaint against the one whose name she would have confused with. After this conclusion, they see Mano (one among the three young boys) on the road on his way to the police station.

To Deepak and Gautham, Mano narrates the incident of how they hit the man while driving the car, and later carrying the body and finally realizing that the body was taken by the original killer. He confesses this to the police and says that the paperboy who saw them hit the man has been asking for ransom and threatening them. The paperboy explains to the police that on the day of the incidence, he saw a man with a bullet wound who had apparently committed suicide and another case where the car hit a man. Gautham and Deepak hypothesize the situation by narrating a story: Both Krish and Shruti are in the apartment and then the anonymous killer breaks in and kidnaps Shruti, Krish, and Vaishnavi's assumed boyfriend and threatens Vaishnavi. While trying to escape, Krish is killed. Vaishnavi's boyfriend (assumed) also escapes and is hit by the car and killed. But they are not sure of the story. They get a lead that a guy is throwing a dead body near the outskirts and go there. Finally, they see the car number and follows it. But Gautham and Deepak meet with an accident. Deepak's left foot is amputated, and he retires from the force.

After narrating this much, Deepak asks the other man to whom he was narrating the story whether he still wants to be in the police. Deepak excuses himself into the house. While he is there, he realises that the person with whom he was conversing is not whom he thought. He becomes cautious and takes his pistol.

When Deepak meets the other man at the lawn table, the other man points his pistol at Deepak and reveals himself to be Gowtham. Gowtham had suffered burns from the accident and was  comatose for five years. Due to his burn injuries, he had been permanently relieved from field duty, and his voice also changed. His face was also reconstructed due to burns. When Gowtham decided to meet Deepak to solve his only field case, he had seen the killer leaving Deepak's home, after meeting Deepak. Shocked, Gowtham had posed as someone else and all led to that moment. Meanwhile, Deepak's staff call in the police, and Gautham is about to be nabbed. He asks Deepak about the killer, and Deepak reveals the killer as his own Son Rajiv.

The true incident is revealed: It was Shruti's birthday. Vaishnavi and Shruti's boyfriend Rajiv come home early to surprise her. Krish, faking his name is Mano, comes inside the apartment with his friend, rapes her, and shoots the same in their phone. He is the same guy against whom Shruti has filed an eve-teasing complaint. They later take Shruti with them and Rajiv chases them. Near the park, Rajiv fights and kills Krish and the other one while trying to run from Rajiv is hit in the car by three young men. Rajiv asks Vaishnavi to report that Shruti is missing. Rajiv later takes Shruti and Vaishnavi back to Nashik to save them. He takes the other guy's body from the three young men's (Fabian, Mano and Melvin) car to take his phone where they recorded Shruti's rape.

After the accident, Vaishnavi comes to Deepak to tell him what happened.  Deepak is shot by Gowtham and dies, while Gowtham is killed by police fire. He says he saved his son, but now can die without guilt.

Cast

 Rahman as Deepak, retired Inspector of Police
 Prakash Vijayaraghavan as  Gautham, before he underwent reconstruction facial surgery due to the accident.
 Ashwin Kumar as Gautham, after he underwent reconstruction facial surgery due to the accident.
 Pradeep as Rajan
 Anjana Jayaprakash as Vaishnavi
 Yashika Aannand as Shruti
 Kunal Kaushik as Rajiv
 "Irumbu Thirai" Sharath Ravi as Paperboy
 Santhosh Krishna as Fabian
 Praveen as Mano
 Karthikeyan as Melvin
 Vinod Varma as Krish
 Bala Hasan as Prem
 Delhi Ganesh as Sriram
 SM. Sivakumar
 Karthick Naren as Short film director (cameo)

Note
The name of the movie "Dhuruvangal 16" also alludes to the fact that there are 16 characters in it as mentioned above, and they indulge in extreme life events, making it 16 extremes (Dhuruvangal 16).

Production

Development 
In September 2015, Rahman revealed that he would work on a Tamil thriller film to be directed by Karthick Naren, then only aged twenty-one years old. Rahman stated that was initially apprehensive about signing on to feature in a film to be made by newcomers and held a few hearings despite being impressed with the way the script was presented to him through a narration that was both "appealing and convincing". Debutant director Karthick revealed that Rahman was his "only choice" for the lead role, while stating the script was "the culmination of an intensive probe into the world of crime" and that his father would back the film as the producer.

Cast and crew 
Sujith Sarang, Sreejith Sarang and Jakes Bejoy, who had previously worked together in Thakka Thakka (2015), collaborated again to work as the cinematographer, editor and music composer for the project. Sachin Sudhakaran and Hariharan worked on the sound engineering for the film, with Rajakrishnan assisting as the mixing engineer.

Apart from Rahman, the only other notable actor cast in the film was Delhi Ganesh, with most of the remaining actors being newcomers. Ashwin Kumar, who previously appeared in a supporting role in Jacobinte Swargarajyam (2016), was also picked to play a role, with his identity kept secret during the promotions. Rookie actress Yaashika Aanand appeared in the role of Shruti, her second film appearance following a brief role in Kavalai Vendam (2016). Anjana Jayaprakash, who portrayed the role of Vaishnavi, was a college senior of the director and was signed after the pair had a mutual interest for working on short films.

Filming 
The film was predominantly shot in October and November 2015, over a short period of 28 days in and around Chennai, Coimbatore and Ooty.

Music
The film's soundtrack consists of two songs composed by Jakes Bejoy, which had lyrics written by Vivek and Mani Amudhavan.

Release
The film's first look was released by director Gautham Vasudev Menon through a poster in January 2016, while R. Madhavan and A. R. Rahman released a further poster and the trailer of the film, respectively, during August 2016. Prior to the theatrical release of the film, Rahman screened the film for his friends in the film industry. The film was theatrically released across Tamil Nadu on 29 December 2016, alongside seven other films and played initially in 95 screens. However, by the first show, the film started receiving a good response, and positive word-of-mouth meant that 160 screens played the film in its second week. Furthermore, the film was moved from smaller halls in cinemas to the biggest main screens in several multiplexes across Chennai. It subsequently went on to become a commercial success at the box office, with Sify.com stating it was a "multiplex super hit". Following the release of the film, it received widespread critical acclaim with several Indian actors and technicians praising the venture. Rahman praised the team and stated he was "left in awe at the efforts of the youthful brigade, and things fell in place as if it was programmed that way" and noted that "the success should inspire other directors to think out of the box". Leading Tamil film technicians including A. R. Rahman, Shankar, AR Murugadoss and Karthik Subbaraj tweeted appreciating the film, as did actors such as Vijay, Silambarasan, Sivakarthikeyan, Rana Daggubati and Prashanth.

Dubs

It was dubbed and released in Telugu as 16- Every Detail Counts alongside Tamil. In 2019, its Hindi dubbed version was released as D-16. The Hindi version's satellite rights belong to Star India and the digital rights are acquired by Disney+ Hotstar.

Reception

Critical response 
In his review for The Hindu, film critic Baradwaj Rangan gave the film a positive review and concluded that Dhruvangal Pathinaaru was "a procedural with solid writing, first-rate filmmaking", adding that the director had "announced that he’s a filmmaker". Similarly, The New Indian Express gave the film a very positive review stating "an eminently watchable suspense- thriller, Dhruvangal Pathinaaru has a universal sensibility and a feel that makes Tamil cinema proud", while also singling out Rahman stating he gave a "truly brilliant performance and the best in his career". Sify.com wrote it was a "well executed whodunit murder mystery" and added that the film "engages us throughout and keep throwing surprises till the end". Likewise, Behindwoods.com noted that it was "an engaging thriller with an impressive storyline" and that "Karthick is a director to look out for". Indiaglitz.com stated it was a "fantastic thriller", concluding "D16 is surely the surprise end package to the year 2016, a good finish from a logically sound and promising director supported by a good cast and fine technicalities". The film was later dubbed and released in Telugu as D16 was released in March 2017, after plans to remake it was dropped.

Box office
Dhuruvangal Pathinaaru, made on a shoe-string budget of around ₹2.5 crore, is said to have earned a distributor's share of ₹3.5 crore from Tamil Nadu theatricals alone. Add another ₹3 crore for digital, satellite and remake rights (Hindi and Telugu), and it can be termed a superhit in terms of return on investment

Spin-off

In 2017, Karthick Naren announced that his upcoming directorial venture Naragasooran would be the second of a "thriller trilogy" of films that began with Dhuruvangal Pathinaaru, and set in the same universe as the latter film.

References

External links
 

2016 films
2016 crime thriller films
2010s Tamil-language films
2016 crime drama films
Indian crime drama films
Indian crime thriller films
Indian detective films
Indian nonlinear narrative films
Films shot in Chennai
Films shot in Coimbatore
Films shot in Ooty
Fictional portrayals of the Tamil Nadu Police
2010s police procedural films
Films scored by Jakes Bejoy
Tamil films remade in other languages
2016 directorial debut films
Films directed by Karthick Naren